Jan Daniłowicz (1570–1628) was a Polish nobleman, voivode of the Ruthenian Voivodeship and grandfather of King Jan III Sobieski.

He was voivode of the Ruthenian Voivodship since 1613, castellan of Lviv since 1612, Great Krajczy of the Crown since 1600, Great Podczaszy of the Crown, łowczy of Belz, starost of Belz, Busk, Korsuń and Chyhyryn. In his youth he fought with the Tatars. In 1594 he participated in the suppression of the Nalyvaiko Uprising.

With his first wife Barbara Krasicka he had two daughters:
 Katarzyna – wife of Andrzej Firlej
 Marcjanna – wife of Stefan Koniecpolski

In 1605 he married Zofia Żółkiewska the daughter of Great Hetman of the Crown Stanisław Żółkiewski and had four children:

 Zofia Teofila – mother of King of Poland Jan III Sobieski
 Stanisław (d. 1636) – killed by Tatars
 Jan (b. 1613, d. 1618)
 Dorota – Benedictine Abbess in Lwów since 1640

Coat of arms

Bibliography
  Kazimierz Lepszy, Jan Daniłowicz, In: Polski Słownik Biograficzny, Kraków 1938, Vol. IV, pp. 414-415.

References

External links
 Olesko Castle

1628 deaths
Jan
Polish nobility
Ruthenian nobility of the Polish–Lithuanian Commonwealth
Secular senators of the Polish–Lithuanian Commonwealth
Military personnel of the Polish–Lithuanian Commonwealth
1570 births